Small Talk is a British television game show that aired on BBC1 from 24 July 1994 to 18 December 1996 and is hosted by Ronnie Corbett.

Rounds 1 and 2
Corbett asks the three contestants a question that they asked panel of 9 children (10 or 11 if 1 or 2 squares have pairs). The contestants secretly lock in what they think the majority of the panel answered (the majority guess), and those who are correct get 10 points (5 points in series 1) in round one and 20 points (10 points in series 1) in round two.

After this, one by one, the contestants picked a single child or single pair of children and guess what he, she or they said, and if correct they score 20 points (10 points in series 1) in Round 1 and 30 points (20 points in series 1) in Round 2. During the first series, an incorrect prediction eliminated that player until the end of the round.

Round 3
In this round, only the two players with the highest scores are allowed to play. Now, players alternated thrice by randomly selecting children by square with buzzers located at their lecterns. Otherwise, gameplay is the same, awarding players 40 points per match (30 in series 1).

Final round
In the final round, the winner will try to turn his or her main game score to 500 and to do this they must do the following. The contestant picks 5 panelists and each is given a question. Each kid or pair holds a card with a number on it from 50 to 500 (4 have 50, 2 each of 100 and 250, and one 500). If the contestant guesses the response of the kid or pair correctly he or she will get the points on the card added to his or her overall score. If the contestant gets 500 points or more they will win a weekend holiday. If the winner scored less than 500 points, he or she would be treated to a night out. All players received a souvenir Small Talk trophy.

Transmissions

References

External links

1994 British television series debuts
1996 British television series endings
1990s British game shows
BBC television game shows
English-language television shows
Television series by Fremantle (company)
Television series by Reg Grundy Productions